The 1987 Montana Grizzlies football team represented the University of Montana in the 1987 NCAA Division I-AA football season as a member of the Big Sky Conference. The Grizzlies were led by second-year head coach Don Read and finished the season with a record of six wins and five losses (6–5, 5–3 Big Sky).

This was the first full season that Montana played at Washington–Grizzly Stadium; the on-campus venue opened the previous October.

Schedule

Source:

References

Montana
Montana Grizzlies football seasons
Montana Grizzlies football